The Electoral district of Eureka is an electoral district of the Victorian Legislative Assembly in Australia. It was created in the redistribution of electoral boundaries in 2021, and came into effect at the 2022 Victorian state election.

It largely covers the area of the abolished district of Buninyong, covering the east and southeast suburbs of Ballarat, including the suburbs of Eureka, Brown Hill, Ballarat East, Golden Point, Canadian, Mount Pleasant, Mount Clear, Mount Helen and Buninyong. It also covers large parts of the Golden Plains Shire and Moorabool Shire areas, including the towns of Ballan, Bacchus Marsh, Meredith, Lethbridge, Teesdale and Inverleigh.

The abolished seat of Buninyong was held by Labor MP Michaela Settle, who recontested Eureka and retained the seat at the 2022 election.

Election results

See also

Parliaments of the Australian states and territories
List of members of the Victorian Legislative Assembly

References

Eureka, Electoral district of
City of Ballarat
2022 establishments in Australia
Shire of Moorabool
Golden Plains Shire
Bacchus Marsh